Duror was a railway station on Cuil Bay on the east shore of Loch Linnhe at Keil, south of Duror, in Highland region. It was on the Ballachulish branch line that linked Connel Ferry, on the main line of the Callander and Oban Railway, with Ballachulish.

History 
This station opened on 24 August 1903. It was laid out with two platforms, one on either side of a crossing loop. There was a siding to the north of the station, on the east side of the line.

One platform was taken out of use on 8 April 1927 along with the crossing loop.

The station closed in 1966, when the Ballachulish Branch of the Callander and Oban Railway was closed.

Signalling 
Throughout its existence, the Ballachulish Branch was worked by the electric token system. Duror signal box, which had 18 levers, was located on the Up platform, on the east side of the railway. The signal box and crossing loop were taken out of use on 8 April 1927.

References

Notes

Sources 
 
 
 

Lochaber
Railway stations in Great Britain opened in 1903
Railway stations in Great Britain closed in 1966
Disused railway stations in Highland (council area)
Beeching closures in Scotland
Former Caledonian Railway stations
James Miller railway stations